White superficial onychomycosis is an infection of the nail plate by fungus, primarily affecting the surface of the nail.

See also 
 Onychomycosis
 Skin lesion

References 

Mycosis-related cutaneous conditions